519th may refer to:

519th Air Defense Group, disbanded United States Air Force organization
519th Fighter-Interceptor Squadron, inactive United States Air Force unit
519th Military Intelligence Battalion (United States), unit of the United States Army

See also
519 (number)
519, the year 519 (DXIX) of the Julian calendar
519 BC